John Bradshaw (29 October 1812 – 14 November 1880) was an English cricketer of the nineteenth century. A batsman, Bradshaw made six first-class appearances for Cambridge University cricket teams between 1833 and 1835, and one for an England side in 1849, scoring 102 runs in total at a batting average of 9.27. It is not known if he was right- or left-handed. Born in Barrow-on-Soar, in Leicestershire, he died aged 68 in Granby, Nottinghamshire.

Bradshaw was educated at Uppingham School and St John's College, Cambridge. He became a Church of England priest and was vicar of Granby-cum-Sutton, Nottinghamshire from 1845 to his death.

References

1812 births
1880 deaths
English cricketers
Cambridge University cricketers
People from Barrow upon Soar
Cricketers from Leicestershire
People educated at Uppingham School
Alumni of St John's College, Cambridge
19th-century English Anglican priests
All-England Eleven cricketers